"The Kerry Recruit" is an Irish song referring to the Crimean War. The song's lyrics are from the point of view of an Irish soldier (from County Kerry).

Rumour has it, that if you were around during the playing of "The Kerry Recruit" during the Crimean War, you were to be thrown in jail.

The lyrics of the song:
About four years ago I was digging the land
With me bróga on me feet and me spade in me hand
Says I to me self, what a pity to see,
Such a fine strapping lad footing turf round Tralee

CHORUS
With me too rum a na, with me too rum a na,
With me too rum an urum an urum a na.

Well I buttered me bróga, an' shook hands with me spade,
An' away to the fair, like a dashing young blade
When up comes a sergeant an he asks me to 'list,
Dhera, sergeant a ghrádh, stick a bob in me fist!

CHORUS

Now the first thing they gave me it was a red coat,
With a wide strap of leather to tie round me throat
Then they gave me a quare thing, I asked what was that,
They told me it was a cockade for me hat

CHORUS

The next thing they gave me, they called it a gun,
With powder an ball an' a place for me thumb.
Well first she spat fire, and then she spewed smoke,
An' she gave me oul shoulders a hell of a stroke

CHORUS

Well the first place they sent me was down by the sea,
On board of a warship bound for the Crimea
Three sticks in the middle all rowled round with sheets,
Faith, she walked on the water without any feet!

CHORUS

When at Balaclava we landed quite sound,
Cold, wet and hungry we lay on the ground
Next morning for action the bugle did call,
And we had a hot breakfast of powder and ball

CHORUS

Well we fought at the Alma, likewise Inkermann,
But the Russians they whiled us at the Redan
In scalin' the walls there, meself lost an eye,
And a big Russian bullet ran away with me thigh.

CHORUS

Well they brought me a doctor, he soon staunched me blood,
Then they gave me an elegant leg made of wood.
They gave me a medal and tenpence a day,
Contented with Síle, I'll live on half pay.

CHORUS

References

Irish songs
1915 songs
The Dubliners songs